Felix in Hollywood is a 1923 short featuring Felix the Cat.

Plot
Felix and his owner go to Hollywood and once they arrive, Felix meets Charlie Chaplin, Douglas Fairbanks, William S. Hart, Cecil B. DeMille, Will Hays, Snub Pollard & Ben Turpin, in the first animated cartoon to feature caricatures of Hollywood celebrities.

Reception
The short was named #50 of The 50 Greatest Cartoons of all time in a 1994 survey of animators and cartoon historians by Jerry Beck, making it the only Felix the Cat cartoon on the list.

See also
 Mickey's Gala Premier
 Mickey's Polo Team
 Mother Goose Goes Hollywood
 Hollywood Steps Out
 Hollywood Daffy
 The Autograph Hound
 Slick Hare
 What's Cookin' Doc?

References

External links

Felix the Cat films
1923 short films
1920s animated short films
1920s American animated films
1923 animated films
American black-and-white films
American silent short films
Films about Hollywood, Los Angeles
Animation based on real people
Cultural depictions of Charlie Chaplin
Films directed by Otto Messmer
Hollywood, Los Angeles in fiction